James Hugh Allister  (born 2 April 1953) is a British Unionist politician and barrister in Northern Ireland. He founded the Traditional Unionist Voice (TUV) political party in 2007, leading the party since its formation. 
Allister has served as a  Member of the Northern Ireland Assembly (MLA) for North Antrim since 2011, and is the TUV’s only representative in the Assembly.

He was formerly a member of the Democratic Unionist Party (DUP), for which he successfully stood for election in 2004 to the European Parliament for  Northern Ireland, succeeding Ian Paisley. He continued as a Member of the European Parliament (MEP) following his resignation from the DUP and his subsequent establishment of the TUV in 2007.

Background
Allister was born in Listooder, Crossgar, in County Down where he lived until he was nine when his family moved to Craigantlet, Newtownards. Allister was a pupil at Barnamaghery Primary School and later Dundonald Primary School when he moved house. After attending Regent House Grammar School in Newtownards, Allister graduated with a Bachelor of Laws with Honours in Constitutional Law from Queen's University, Belfast. In 1974, he unsuccessfully stood for the post of President of Queen's University Belfast Students' Union.

He was called to the Bar of Northern Ireland as a barrister in 1976, where he specialised in criminal law, and, in 2001, was called to the Senior Bar as a Queen's Counsel.

Political career
Allister quit the Official Unionist Party (OUP) to join the DUP at its founding in 1971. In June 1972, as chairman of the Queen's University Democratic Unionist Party Association, Allister wrote a letter published in the Belfast Telegraph arguing that Ian Paisley was closely aligned with Enoch Powell's "integrationist" stance that Northern Ireland should be closer to the rest of the United Kingdom, and that other Unionist leaders were in favour of devolution. In March 1973 Allister was elected to the post of publicity officer for the Queen's DUP Association. He was involved in the 1974 Ulster Workers' Council strike against the Sunningdale Agreement, which had been signed the previous December. A senior loyalist politician recalled walking into the Ulster Workers' Council HQ on Hawthornden Road in Belfast to find Allister and Peter Robinson "giggling" while phoning Social Democratic and Labour Party (SDLP) headquarters claiming to be Catholics in distress in a loyalist area afflicted by the strike and asking the SDLP to send a car to rescue them. He served as a European Parliament assistant to Ian Paisley from 1980 to 1982. 

In 1982 he was elected as a Member of the Northern Ireland Assembly at Stormont for North Antrim and served as the DUP Assembly Chief Whip. In 1983 Allister stated that if the DUP were faced with a choice between no devolved government and a power-sharing government with the SDLP or other Nationalist representatives, his party would opt for not having a devolved government. He was also the Vice-Chairman of Scrutiny Committee of Department of Finance and Personnel from October 1982 to June 1986. Outside the Stormont Assembly, he was a member of Newtownabbey Borough Council from 1985 to 1987. In 1983, he stood as a DUP candidate in the Westminster election for East Antrim. However, he narrowly lost to Roy Beggs following a bitter campaign in which he denounced Beggs as a "political gypsy" for leaving the DUP and joining the OUP; Beggs had resigned from the DUP after leading a Larne council delegation to Dún Laoghaire in the Republic of Ireland.

In August 1985 Allister attended the first major meeting of the United Ulster Loyalist Front (UULF) in Portadown. The UULF had originally formed as a committee earlier that year to oppose police plans to reroute traditional Orange Order parades away from nationalist areas of Portadown. The UULF was supported by the Ulster Defence Association (UDA) with South Belfast Brigade chief and UDA deputy leader John McMichael being appointed to the coordinating committee. Unionists blamed the Irish government for loyalist parades being rerouted from predominantly Catholic areas and the UULF's stated purpose was to oppose further perceived interference from Dublin, although the group's secretary told the press ahead of the meeting that "[he] would not expect paramilitary action to be decided tonight". 

Following the signing of the Anglo-Irish Agreement in November 1985 by the Thatcher and FitzGerald governments, he was a high-profile opponent of the treaty. He was a member of the Joint Unionist Working Party, a body set up by his party and the Ulster Unionist Party (UUP) to oversee the unionist campaign against the Agreement. During the one-day loyalist strike against the Agreement in March 1986 it was reportedly difficult for journalists to move around the "loyalist stronghold" of Larne without the permission of Allister. He was also very vocal in his criticism of Royal Ulster Constabulary (RUC) Chief Constable John Hermon; the Irish Independent wrote in June 1986 that most of the statements sent by Allister with regards to the Chief Constable could not be printed "having regards to the law of defamation and libel". In May 1986 Allister led thirteen other DUP politicians in an occupation of the telephone exchange at Parliament Buildings at Stormont and blocked calls from going through to government departments. The siege ended after the RUC used a sledgehammer to breach the barricaded door. Allister and then DUP deputy leader Peter Robinson held a press conference in September that year threatening to declare Northern Ireland independent from the United Kingdom if the Anglo-Irish Agreement wasn't withdrawn.  In November 1986 the SDLP called for Allister and other Unionist politicians to be prosecuted for incitement following a "violent" speech at a DUP demonstration in Carrickfergus, afterwards the crowd had attacked Catholic property resulting in the death of an elderly Catholic woman. 

That same month Allister organised a rally inaugurating the Ballymena battalion of a new loyalist paramilitary group, Ulster Resistance. Allister, DUP Deputy Leader Peter Robinson, and Ulster Clubs chairman Alan Wright led hundreds of loyalists, many wearing paramilitary uniforms and some wearing masks, parading in a show of strength that culminated at Ballymena Town Hall, where DUP leader Ian Paisley was waiting. Inside Paisley donned a red Ulster Resistance beret on stage, daring the RUC to arrest him while Allister pledged his "personal support" to Ulster Resistance.

Allister claimed that the RUC had erected a "ring of steel" around the town in an attempt to prevent them from marching to the site of the meeting; he was cheered when he informed the gathered crowd that the colour party had instead entered the town through adjoining fields. The RUC denied any undue holdups and stated no arrests were made. When questioned by the press Allister declined to say how many were in attendance but claimed that Ulster Resistance rallies seemed to grow in size every night, declaring:

 

His departure from active politics in June 1987 followed a reported disagreement with Paisley over a voting pact with James Molyneaux's UUP. The situation resembled fellow unionist politician and barrister Robert McCartney's in the North Down constituency. McCartney was expelled from the UUP around the same time for not accepting the policy of the leadership.

Allister returned to the DUP in 2004 and successfully ran as the party's candidate in that year's  European Parliamentary election, topping the poll with 175,000 first preference votes, 32% of the total. 

He proved to be an assiduous MEP, participating in many more parliamentary debates and asking many more questions than his fellow Northern Irish MEPS Bairbre de Brún of Sinn Féin and Jim Nicholson of the Ulster Unionist Party. Allister was also active as a member of the European Parliament Fisheries Committee and was ranked by the pressure group TaxPayers' Alliance as the most "hard-working, transparent and pro-taxpayer" of the 75 United Kingdom MEPs during the 2004-2009 European Parliament. 

On 27 March 2007, Allister resigned from the DUP because of the party's decision to enter into government with Sinn Féin. It was the second occasion on which he had resigned from the party.

In late 2007, there was speculation that Allister might found a new Unionist political party. It was also claimed, on 10 October 2007, that he had been approached by the UK Independence Party (UKIP), but he in fact proceeded to found the Traditional Unionist Voice movement on 7 December 2007.

In the 2009 European elections, this time standing as a candidate of Traditional Unionist Voice (TUV), Allister polled 13.5% of the first preference votes cast but was not re-elected.

Jim Allister stood as a TUV candidate in the 2010 Westminster Parliamentary election in the North Antrim constituency. Having polled well in the previous year's European election, Allister stood a chance of winning the seat. This would have been a tremendous loss to the DUP, as it has historically been the party's safest seat and the seat of DUP founder and former party leader Ian Paisley. He came second in the poll with 7,114 votes to the DUP's Ian Paisley Jr who polled 19,672 votes. 

In the 2011 Northern Ireland Assembly election, Allister was elected in the North Antrim constituency for the TUV and retained his seat in the 2016, 2017 and 2022 Assembly elections. 

In August 2012, Allister called the Parades Commission "little Hitlers" when they placed restrictions on a loyalist parade.

In June 2013, a Private Members Bill  proposed by Allister - the Civil Service (Special Advisers) Bill, was voted into law  at the Northern Ireland Assembly. The bill's aim was to tighten the rules governing appointment of Special Advisers (SPADS)  by ministers of the Northern Ireland government. Amongst other things, the new law debarred anyone convicted of an offence carrying a jail sentence of five years or more from appointment as a SPAD. Mr Allister said that he was inspired to introduce the bill by the example of Ann Tavers who had protested against the appointment, in 2011, of former IRA member Mary McArdle  to the position of Special Adviser by the then Sinn Féin minister for Culture and Arts. Ms McArdle had been convicted for her part in the 1972 murder of  Mary Travers and the serious wounding of her father, Tom Travers, a Belfast magistrate. Some years later, Mr Allister recalled: "I labelled it 'Ann's Law' because that's a proper tribute to the driving force behind it. That's probably my proudest moment as a politician … to have left on the statute book the first victory in years for innocent victims."

Allister holds conservative views on social policy and is a supporter of the evangelical creationist lobby group, the Caleb Foundation. 

Allister opposed a motion pardoning gay men convicted for formerly illegal homosexual acts.

An August 2021, opinion poll by the polling company LucidTalk found a large rise in support for Allister's party the TUV to 14% of first preference vote intentions in the upcoming May 2022 Northern Ireland Assembly elections. At the same time, the poll found that 51% of those who responded rated Allister's performance as "bad or awful", compared with "bad or awful" ratings for Paul Givan, Jeffrey Donaldson and Michelle O'Neill of 48%, 47% and 45% respectively.

See also
Traditional Unionist Voice

References

External links
European Parliament profile
Leading for Ulster: Speaking for You (a collection of speeches by Allister)
Maiden Speech in European Parliament, 21 July 2004

1953 births
Living people
Traditional Unionist Voice politicians
Alumni of Queen's University Belfast
British King's Counsel
Democratic Unionist Party MEPs
MEPs for Northern Ireland 2004–2009
Members of Newtownabbey Borough Council
Northern Ireland MLAs 2011–2016
Northern Ireland MLAs 2016–2017
Northern Ireland MLAs 2017–2022
Northern Ireland MPAs 1982–1986
Northern Ireland King's Counsel
People educated at Regent House Grammar School
People from County Down
Presbyterians from Northern Ireland
20th-century King's Counsel
21st-century King's Counsel
Traditional Unionist Voice MEPs
Traditional Unionist Voice MLAs
British political party founders
Northern Ireland MLAs 2022–2027
Leaders of political parties in Northern Ireland